Philip Needleman is an American pharmacologist and academic. Needleman was a professor and associate dean at the Washington University School of Medicine and he served as an executive at Monsanto/Searle.  He is credited with discovering  the first thromboxane synthase inhibitor, the inflammatory substance known as COX-2 and the cardiac hormone known as atriopeptin. Needleman is a member of the National Academy of Sciences and a Fellow of the American Academy of Arts and Sciences.

Biography
Needleman attended the Philadelphia College of Pharmacy and Science, where he earned an undergraduate degree and a master's degree, both in pharmacology. He subsequently studied at the University of Maryland School of Medicine and received a doctoral degree in pharmacology. 

He was a postdoctoral fellow at the Washington University School of Medicine, remaining there as a faculty member. He became a full professor and he chaired the pharmacology department from 1976 to 1989. 

In 1989 left academia for industry and became vice president of Monsanto. In 1993 he became president of Searle. There he oversaw research into COX-2 that led to the development of the anti-inflammatory drug celecoxib (Celebrex), which was approved in 1998 by the Food and Drug Administration (FDA). He became senior executive vice president and chief scientist of Pharmacia from 2000 to 2003.

He returned to academia as an associate dean at the Washington University School of Medicine in 2004 and was subsequently named to the school's board of trustees. He served as interim president of two institutions, the Donald Danforth Plant Science Center and the Saint Louis Science Center.  

Needleman was elected to the National Academy of Sciences in 1987 in the physiology and pharmacology section. He received the NAS Award for the Industrial Application of Science in 2005 for his work on "metabolism of arachidonic acid in physiology and pathophysiology, which generates prostacyclin and thromboxane." He was named a fellow of the American Academy of Arts and Sciences in 2015.

References

External links
 National Academy of Sciences profile

Living people
American pharmacologists
University of Maryland School of Medicine alumni
University of the Sciences alumni
Monsanto employees
Fellows of the American Academy of Arts and Sciences
Members of the National Academy of Medicine
Pharmaceutical scientists
Year of birth missing (living people)
Washington University in St. Louis fellows
Washington University School of Medicine faculty